Double Trouble is a song by Hong Kong singer and actor Jacky Cheung, written by Roxanne Seeman, Kine Ludvigsen-Fossheim, and Olav Fossheim with lyrics adapted into Cantonese by Hong Kong lyricist Kenny So. Double Trouble was issued as the first single from Cheung's Private Corner album, released by What's Music, a subsidiary label of Universal Music Group in 2010, with a companion MV premiering March 2010.

Hong Kong Music Charts
"Double Trouble" reached number 1 on the HMVHK sales chart (most popular Hong Kong radio chart) April 2010. Cheung's "Private Corner" album remained at number 1 on the HMVHK sales chart for 13 weeks.

Credits and personnel 
 Jacky Cheung – lead vocals
 Guillermo Fuego Jr. – acoustic guitar
 Charles Huntley – alto saxophone, tenor saxophone, horns
 Andrew Tuason杜自持 – arranger, bass, drum programming, piano, horns
 Lydia Chew And Group – backing vocals
 Kenny So (乔星 Qiao Xing) - lyrics
 Roxanne Seeman, Olav Fossheim, Kine Ludvigsen – music
 Benjamin Pelletier - trombone
 John Campo - trumpet

Music video
With sales for Jacky Cheung's Private Corner album reaching 200,000 copies in Asia alone, a celebration gathering was held by Universal Music, where Cheung debuted the MV for "Double Trouble", which he invested HKD$500,000 of his own money to make.  The MV was directed by Xia Yong Kang and features mainland China model Du Juan.

The Double Trouble MV was included as a bonus extra in Jacky Cheung's Private Corner Mini Concert DVD release.

Critical reception 
Tencent ranked Double Trouble as best single from the Private Corner album remarking "one feels the mood of caution when facing gangsters without losing the rhythm and jumping sense of jazz" and "adds a sense of joy in "fighting gangsters and having fun".

Live performances and usage in other media

Private Corner Mini Concert 
Cheung performed "Double Trouble" at his Private Corner Mini Concert at the Hong Kong Jockey Club on April 30.  The show was taped, with the "Private Corner" Mini Concert DVD  releasing July 23, 2010.

Jacky Cheung 1/2 Century Tour 
The Jacky Cheung 1/2 Century Tour, opened in Shanghai, New Year's Eve 2011. “Double Trouble” is a highlight song in the concert.  Cheung performs the song, singing and dancing, with 25 musicians and 18 dancers.  At the end of the song, Jacky Cheung makes his getaway in a helicopter built for the set. The tour finale was in May 2012. There were 146 shows.

Live in Hong Kong/2012 performance of "Double Trouble" is included in Jacky Cheung's 1/2 Century Tour concert Live CD & DVD, released July 19, 2013.

Jade Solid Gold Best Ten Music Awards 
Double Trouble was the opening production number of TVB's Jade Solid Gold Best Ten Music Awards Presentation 2012, performed live by the cast of Hong Kong hit artists appearing on the show. Among them, one of the host Wu Yongwei even showed her elegant dance on the stage.

Miss Universe China
A live band played a version of Double Trouble during the Miss Universe China Pageant September 28, 2013, Shanghai.

References

External link 

Songs written by Roxanne Seeman
2010 songs
Jacky Cheung songs
Cantonese-language songs
Jazz songs
Macaronic songs